Ravi Sah also known as Ravi Bhushan Bhartiya is an Indian actor. He is a graduate of the Film and Television Institute of India (FTII) and he is most known for his role as Balram Singh in Paan Singh Tomar.

Early life
Ravi Sah was born and brought up in Purnia, Bihar. He is educated at the Jawahar Navodaya Vidyalaya, Purnia. He has done his graduation in journalism from Makhan Lal Chaturvedi Journalism Institute, Bhopal. He is a graduate of the Film and Television Institute of India (FTII), Pune.

Film career
Ravi started his acting journey as a theatre artist. He worked in theatre for more than 5 years with Ram Gopal Bajaj, Late Habib Tanveer, Alok Chatterjee & Late Alakhnandan. Have been associated with Indian People's Theatre Association (IPTA).

Filmography

All films are in Hindi unless otherwise noted.

Films

Web series

References

External links 

 

Living people
Male actors from Bihar
Male actors in Hindi cinema
Male actors in Hindi television
Year of birth missing (living people)